George Sabin Gibbs (December 14, 1875 – January 8, 1947) was a United States Army officer. After serving as a brigadier general during World War I, he was promoted to major general and served as Chief Signal Officer for the Signal Corps.

Early life
Gibbs was born in Harlan, Iowa, in 1875. He graduated from Harlan High School in 1892, from the State University of Iowa with a B.S. degree in 1897, and by 1901 had earned a M.S. degree in engineering.

Early military career
In 1898, Gibbs enlisted in the Iowa Volunteer Infantry as a private. During the Spanish–American War and Philippine Insurrection, Gibbs served in the volunteer forces, mainly on Signal Corps duty, in ranks from private to first lieutenant. While a sergeant, Gibbs was cited for gallantry in action against the Spanish forces at Manila.

After being commissioned a first lieutenant in the Signal Corps, Regular Army, Gibbs' various duties included numerous surveys and construction of telegraph lines in Alaska and as chief Army signal officer of the Cuban Pacification.

Later military career
During World War I, Gibbs was the assistant Chief Signal Officer of the American Expeditionary Forces. He received a temporary promotion to brigadier general on October 15, 1918. Gibbs was awarded the Distinguished Service Medal for his participation in the Aisne-Marne and Meuse-Argonne offensives. He also received several foreign awards, including the Legion of Honour, Order of St Michael and St George, Order of the Crown of Belgium, and the Order of the Crown of Italy.

After the war, Gibbs reverted to his permanent rank of lieutenant colonel on July 14, 1919 and graduated from United States Army War College in 1920. His post World War I assignments included duty on the War Department General Staff and executive officer to the Assistant Secretary of War. In 1924, he supervised the completion of the new Washington–Alaska cable.

Promoted to major general, Gibbs became Chief Signal Officer on January 19, 1928.  He held this position until his retirement on June 30, 1931.

Civilian career
After retirement, Gibbs was vice president of the International Telephone and Telegraph Company  and in October 1931 president of the Postal Telegraph Cable Company.  Later, in 1934, he served as vice chairman of the board and a director of the Federal Telephone and Radio Corporation.

Death and legacy
Gibbs died on January 8, 1947, at Coral Gables, Florida.  He was buried with full military honors in Section 3 of Arlington National Cemetery.  His son David Parker Gibbs was a career army officer who attained the rank of major general and also served as head of the signal corps.

Gibbs' papers are at the Library of Congress.

References

Bibliography
"George Sabin Gibbs, Major General, United States Army". Arlington National Cemetery., which in turn was sourced from Coker, Kathy R., and Stokes, Carol E. A Concise History of The U.S. Army Signal Corps, p. 69, February 1991

External links

 
 

1875 births
1947 deaths
People from Harlan, Iowa
University of Iowa alumni
Military personnel from Iowa
American military personnel of the Spanish–American War
Recipients of the Silver Star
American military personnel of the Philippine–American War
United States Army generals of World War I
Recipients of the Distinguished Service Medal (US Army)
Officiers of the Légion d'honneur
Companions of the Order of St Michael and St George
Commanders of the Order of the Crown (Belgium)
Recipients of Italian civil awards and decorations
United States Army War College alumni
United States Army generals
Chief Signal Officer, U.S. Army
Burials at Arlington National Cemetery